José Luis Turina (born 1952, in Madrid) is a Spanish composer, grandson of Joaquín Turina.

He studied composition under Antón García Abril, Román Alís, Rodolfo Halffter and Carmelo Bernaola at the conservatories of Barcelona and Madrid, and then, with a grant from the Spanish Ministry for Foreign Affairs for studying at the Spanish Fine Arts Academy in Rome, he attended the classes in composition given by Franco Donatoni at the Accademia di Santa Cecilia.

In 1981, his work Meeting Point won the First Prize in the International Composition Contest organised by the Orchestra of the Valencia Conservatory to mark their first centenary. In 1986 he won the First Prize of the Musical Composition Contest “Queen Sofía”, from the Ferrer Salat Foundation, with his piece Ocnos (orchestral music on poems by Luis Cernuda). He was awarded Spain's Premio Nacional de Música for composition in 1996.

Teacher of Harmony in the Conservatories of Cuenca and Madrid since 1981, in 1993 he was designated technical advisor of the Ministry for Education and Science, for the reformation of musical teaching in the realm of the new education law of 1990. In February 2001 he was appointed Artistic Director of the Spanish National Youth Orchestra, position he held until his retirement in March 2020, and from 2004 until 2015 he was the President of the Spanish Association of Youth Orchestras.

In September 2000 the world premiere of his opera D. Q. (Don Quijote in Barcelona), on a text by Justo Navarro and in a production by La Fura dels Baus, took place in the Gran Teatre del Liceu (Barcelona, Spain). In November 2001 the Tokyo String Quartet played with great success the world premiere of his string quartet “Clémisos y Sustalos”, written as a commission for them. In October 2004, the Brodsky Quartet premiered his string quartet “The Seven Last Words of Jesus Christ on the Cross” in Cadiz. In January 2006, he was the focus of the Contemporary Music Cycle of the Málaga Philharmonic Orchestra, which played 18 of his compositions, and released both an extensive biographical study and a CD of five of his orchestral pieces.

Selected works
Opera & stage works
 Ligazon (1981–82), chamber opera in one act and 5 scenes, based on a play by Ramón del Valle-Inclán, premiered 2 July 1982, in Cuenca.
 La raya en el agua (1995-95). Premiere: 26 September 1996, Círculo de Bellas Artes, Madrid
 D.Q. (Don Quijote en Barcelona) (1998–99); Opera in 3 acts, based on the Miguel de Cervantes novel Don Quixote; libretto by Justo Navarro, staged by La Fura dels Baus at the Liceu, Barcelona. (2 October 2000)
 Tour de Manivelle (2006-2007), music theatre work for actress, orchestra and video, texts by the composer and five short films by Segundo de Chomón. Premiere: May 2008, Teatro de la Zarzuela, Madrid.

Orchestral
 Punto de encuentro (1979)
 Pentimento (1983)
 Fantasía sobre una Fantasía de Alonso Mudarra (1989)
 El arpa y la sombra (1991)
 Música fugitiva (1992)
 Fantasía sobre doce notas (1994)
 Dos danzas sinfónicas (1996)
 La Commedia dell'Arte (2007)

Concertante
 Ocnos (orchestral music on poems by Luis Cernuda) (1982–84), for speaker, cello and orchestra
 Concierto para violín y orquesta (1987)
 Variaciones y desavenencias sobre temas de Boccherini (1988), concerto for harpsichord and orchestra
 Concierto para piano y orquesta (1997)
 Concerto da chiesa (1998), for cello and strings
 Cuatro sonetos de Shakespeare (2001-2002), for soprano and orchestra
 Concierto para marimba y cuerdas (2012)

Choir & Orchestra
 Exequias (In memoriam Fernando Zóbel) (1984), choir and chamber orchestra
 Musica ex lingua (1989), on texts by Agustín García Calvo, Lope de Vega, Luis de Góngora, José Bergamín, Ramón del Valle-Inclán and Francisco de Quevedo
 Tres villancicos (2006)

Choir
 Para saber si existo (1979), on poems by Gabriel Celaya
 Per la morte di un capolavoro (1995), on a poem by Gabriele D'Annunzio
 Canzon de cuna pra Rosalía Castro, morta (2003), on poems by Rosalía de Castro and Federico García Lorca
 Ritirata notturna (2009)

Accompanied voice
 Epílogo del misterio (1979), on poems by José Bergamín (mezzo-soprano and piano)
 Primera antolojía (1979), on poems by Juan Ramón Jiménez (soprano and piano)
 Tres sonetos (1992), on poems by Lope de Vega, Luis de Góngora and Francisco de Quevedo (low voice, clarinet, violin/viola and piano)
 Tres poemas cantados (1993), on poems by Federico García Lorca (soprano and piano)
 Canción apócrifa (1994), on a poem by Antonio Machado (soprano and piano)
 Cinco canciones amatorias (1994), on poems by Catalan writers of 14th-16th centuries (soprano and piano or strings)
 En forma de cuento (1994), on a poem by Rafael Alberti
 Callada partida (2013), on a poem by Conchita Colón (mezzo and piano sextet)
 Nada te turbe (2014), on a poem by Santa Teresa (narrator and piano)
 Cinco canciones verdes (2016), on poems by Safo, Delmira Agustini, Giuseppe Gioacchino Belli, Rainer Maria Rilke and Catulo (soprano and piano)
 Salomé, cáliz vacío (2016), on poems by Delmira Agustini, texts by Oscar Wilde y excerpts from Salomé de Richard Strauss (soprano/actress and piano)
 Soneto Quasi una Fantasía (2017), on the sonnet "A Beethoven" by Gerardo Diego (soprano and piano)

Chamber
 Movimiento (1978), for violin and piano
 Crucifixus (1978), for 20 strings and piano
 Homenaje a Cesar Franck (1979), for wind quintet
 Iniciales (1980), for flute and piano
 Título a determinar (1980), for septet
 Fantasía sobre "Don Giovanni" (1980), for piano four-hands
 Trio (1982), for violin, cello and piano
 Variaciones sobre dos temas de Scarlatti (2005), for sextet
 Cuarteto en sol (1985), for string quartet
 La Commedia dell'Arte (1986), for flute, viola and guitar, and (1990), for flute, viola and harp
 Variaciones sobre un tema de Prokofiev (1986), for bassoon and piano
 Sonata da chiesa (1986–87), for viola and piano
 Divertimento, aria y serenata (1987), for viola octet, and (1991), for cello octet
 Dos duetos (1988), for cello and piano, and (1992), for viola and piano
 Kammerconcertante (1988), for flute in g, bass clarinet, violin, viola, cello and double-bass
 Seis metaplasmos (1990), for two violins
 Variaciones y tema (series 1 & 2), sobre el Tema con variaciones "Ah, vous dirai-je, maman!", de W. A. Mozart (1990), for violin and piano, and (2008), for two pianos
 Túmulo de la mariposa (1991), for clarinet, cello and piano
 Sonata y Toccata (1991), for piano four-hands
 Rosa engalanada (1992), for flute and guitar
 Cuatro cuartetos (1994), for basset-horn quartet
 Tres palíndromos (1996), for piano four-hands
 Scherzo para un hobbit (1997), for quintet
 PasoDoppio (1999), for clarinet and cello
 Paráfrasis sobre "Don Giovanni" (2000), for cello octet
 Clémisos y Sustalos (2001), for string quartet
 Tres tercetos (2003), for violin, cello and piano
 Octeto de agua (2004), wind octet
 Las siete últimas palabras de Jesucristo en la cruz (2004), for string quartet
 Sonata (2004), for violin and piano
 Viaggio di Parnaso (2005), for violin, cello and piano
 Cinco quintetos (2005), for brass quintet
 Hércules y Cronos (2008), for brass and percussion ensemble
 Danzas entrelazadas (2011), for flute, clarinet, percussion and piano sextet
 Die Windsbraut (2012), for wind quintet
 Paganini 24 (2013), for nonet
 Encore alla turca (2014), for nonet
 Burlesca (2015), for clarinet and piano sextet
 Seis fragmentos de "D.Q. (Don Quijote en Barcelona)" (2016), for wind quintet
 El juego del Cíclope (2017), for trombone and harp
 Bach in excelsis (2017), for string quartet
 Consolación (2018), for french horn and piano
 El viento que nunca duerme (2019), for flute, violin, viola and cello

Solo
 Copla de cante jondo (1980), for guitar
 ¡Ya "uté" ve...! (1982), for piano
 En volandas (1982), for cello
 Dubles (1983), for flute
 Scherzo (1986), for piano
 Amb "P" de Pau (1986), for piano
 Cinco preludios a un tema de Chopin (1987), for piano
 Cuatro estudios en forma de pieza (1989), for guitar
 Cuatro estudios en forma de pieza (1989), for guitar
 Due essercizi (1989), for harpsichord
 Punto de órgano (1990), for organ
 Notas dormidas (1992), for harp
 Monólogos del viento y de la roca (1993), for guitar
 Preludio sobreesdrújulo (1994), for guitar
 Toccata (Homenaje a Manuel de Falla) (1995), for piano
 L'art d'être touché par le clavecin (Sonata para clave) (2000), for harpsichord
 Homenaje a Isaac Albéniz (I. Jaén) (2001), for piano
 Partita (2001), for double-bass
 Catdenza (2003), for clarinet
 Soliloquio (in memoriam Joaquim Homs) (2004), for piano
 Saeta (2006), for marimba
 Homenaje a Isaac Albéniz (II. León) (2009), for piano
 Dos cuadros de Marc Chagall (2009), for violin
 Homenaje a Isaac Albéniz (III. Salamanca) (2010), for piano
 Arboretum (2010), for guitar
 El guardián entre los pinos (2011), for piano
 Collage, (on the Prelude #20  and the 24 Preludes by Chopin) (2014), for piano
 Jeu du solitaire (2012), for violin
 Viola joke (2017), capriccio for viola

Discography (selection)
 Crucifixus (1978), for 20 strings and piano
 Epílogo del misterio (1979), on poems by José Bergamín (mezzo-soprano and piano)
 Punto de encuentro (1979), for orchestra
 Primera antolojía (1979), on poems by Juan Ramón Jiménez (soprano and piano)
 Copla de cante jondo (1980), for guitar
 Fantasía sobre "Don Giovanni" (1980), for piano four-hands
 Título a determinar (1980), for septet
 Iniciales (1980), for flute and piano
 En volandas (1982), for solo cello
 Trio (1982), for violin, cello and piano
 Pentimento (1983), for orchestra
 Ocnos (orchestral music on poems by Luis Cernuda) (1982–84), for speaker, cello and orchestra
 Exequias (In memoriam Fernando Zóbel) (1985), for choir and chamber orchestra
 Variaciones sobre dos temas de Scarlatti (1985), for sextet
 Amb "P" de Pau (1986), for piano
 Scherzo (1986), for piano
 Concierto para violín y orquesta (1987)
 Kammerconcertante (1988), for alto flute, bass clarinet and string quartet
 Fantasía sobre una Fantasía de Alonso Mudarra (1989), for orchestra
 Musica ex lingua (1989), for choir and orchestra
 Dos duetos (1989), for viola and piano
 Due essercizi (1989), for harpsichord
 Cuarteto con piano (1990)
 El arpa y la sombra (1991), for orchestra
 Túmulo de la mariposa (1991), for clarinet, cello and piano
 Música fugitiva (1992), for orchestra
 Rosa engalanada (1992), for flute and guitar
 Monólogos del viento y de la roca (1993), for guitar
 Fantasía sobre doce notas (1994), for orchestra
 Dos danzas sinfónicas (1996), for orchestra
 Concierto para piano y orquesta (1997)
 Scherzo para un hobbit (1997), for quintet
 D.Q. (Don Quijote en Barcelona) (1998–99), opera
 L'art d'être touché par le clavecin (Sonata para clave) (2000), for harpsichord
 Homenaje a Isaac Albéniz (I. Jaén) (2001), for piano
 Octeto de agua (2004), for wind octet
 Soliloquio (in memoriam Joaquim Homs) (2004), for piano
 Cinco quintetos (2005), for brass quintet
 La Commedia dell'Arte (2007), for orchestra
 Homenaje a Isaac Albéniz (II. León) (2009), for piano
 Collage, (on the Prelude #20  and the 24 Preludes by Chopin) (2014), for piano
 Dos cuadros de Marc Chagall (2009), for violin
 Exequias (In memoriam Fernando Zóbel) (1984) for choir and chamber orchestra
 Viola joke'' (2017), capriccio for viola

References

External links
 José Luis Turina website

1952 births
Living people
Male opera composers
Musicians from Madrid
Spanish classical composers
Spanish male classical composers
Spanish opera composers